In astrodynamics, orbit phasing is the adjustment of the time-position of spacecraft along its orbit, usually described as adjusting the orbiting spacecraft's true anomaly. Orbital phasing is primarily used in scenarios where a spacecraft in a given orbit must be moved to a different location within the same orbit. The change in position within the orbit is usually defined as the phase angle, ϕ, and is the change in true anomaly required between the spacecraft's current position to the final position.
 
The phase angle can be converted in terms of time using Kepler's Equation:

where
t is defined as time elapsed to cover phase angle in original orbit
T1 is defined as period of original orbit
E is defined as change of Eccentric anomaly between spacecraft and final position 
e1 is defined as Orbital eccentricity of original orbit
Φ is defined as change in true anomaly between spacecraft and final position

This time derived from the phase angle is the required time the spacecraft must gain or lose to be located at the final position within the orbit. To gain or lose this time, the spacecraft must be subjected to a simple two-impulse Hohmann transfer which takes the spacecraft away from, and then back to, its original orbit. The first impulse to change the spacecraft's orbit is performed at a specific point in the original orbit (point of impulse, POI), usually performed in the original orbit's periapsis or apoapsis. The impulse creates a new orbit called the “phasing orbit” and is larger or smaller than the original orbit resulting in a different period time than the original orbit. The difference in period time between the original and phasing orbits will be equal to the time converted from the phase angle. Once one period of the phasing orbit is complete, the spacecraft will return to the POI and the spacecraft will once again be subjected to a second impulse, equal and opposite to the first impulse, to return it to the original orbit. When complete, the spacecraft will be in the targeted final position within the original orbit.

To find some of the phasing orbital parameters, first one must find the required period time of the phasing orbit using the following equation.

where
T1 is defined as period of original orbit
T2 is defined as period of phasing orbit
t is defined as time elapsed to cover phase angle in original orbit

Once phasing orbit period is determined, the phasing orbit semimajor axis can be derived from the period formula:

where
a2 is defined as semimajor axis of phasing orbit
T2 is defined as period of phasing orbit
μ is defined as Standard gravitational parameter

From the semimajor axis, the phase orbit apogee and perigee can be calculated:

where
a2 is defined as semimajor axis of phasing orbit
ra is defined as apogee of phasing orbit
rp is defined as perigee of phasing orbit

Finally, the phasing orbit's angular momentum can be found from the equation:

where
h2 is defined as angular momentum of phasing orbit
ra is defined as apogee of phasing orbit
rp is defined as perigee of phasing orbit
μ is defined as Standard gravitational parameter

To find the impulse required to change the spacecraft from its original orbit to the phasing orbit, the change of spacecraft velocity,∆V, at POI must be calculated from the angular momentum formula:

where
∆V is change in velocity between phasing and original orbits at POI
v1 is defined as the spacecraft velocity at POI in original orbit
v2 is defined as the spacecraft velocity at POI in phasing orbit
r is defined as radius of spacecraft from the orbit’s focal point to POI
h1 is defined as angular momentum of original orbit
h2 is defined as angular momentum of phasing orbit

Remember that this change in velocity, ∆V, is only the amount required to change the spacecraft from its original orbit to the phasing orbit. A second change in velocity equal to the magnitude but opposite in direction of the first must be done after the spacecraft travels one phase orbit period to return the spacecraft from the phasing orbit to the original orbit. Total change of velocity required for the phasing maneuver is equal to two times ∆V.

Orbit phasing can also be referenced as co-orbital rendezvous  like a successful approach to a space station in a docking maneuver. Here, two spacecraft on the same orbit but at different true anomalies rendezvous by either one or both of the spacecraft entering phasing orbits which cause them to return to their original orbit at the same true anomaly at the same time.

Phasing maneuvers are also commonly employed by geosynchronous satellites, either to conduct station-keeping maneuvers to maintain their orbit above a specific longitude, or to change longitude altogether.

See also

Orbital maneuver
Hohmann transfer orbit
Clohessy-Wiltshire equations for co-orbit analysis
Space rendezvous

References

 General

 
 

 Phasing Maneuver

Astrodynamics